Brigham City Airport  is a city-owned public-use airport located three nautical miles (6 km) northwest of the central business district of Brigham City, in Box Elder County, Utah, United States.

Facilities and aircraft 
It has one asphalt paved runway designated 17/35 which measures 8,900 feet by 100 feet (2,713 x 30 m).

For the 12-month period ending December 31, 2006, the airport had 37,770 aircraft operations, an average of 103 per day: 99% general aviation and 1% air taxi. At that time there were 73 aircraft based at this airport: 93% single-engine, 4% multi-engine and 3% jet.

Recent news
The Brigham City airport is reported to have received over $14 million in 2005 and 2006 in taxes and fees collected from airline passengers, despite the fact that there is no commercial passenger traffic serving the Brigham City airport. This amount is several times more than received by any other airport in the state.

References

External links 
 

Airports in Utah
Buildings and structures in Brigham City, Utah
Transportation in Box Elder County, Utah